Alfred Balthoff (1905 – 1989) was a German stage, film and television actor. He also worked as a voice actor, dubbing foreign releases for the German-speaking market. Of Jewish background, he spent the final years of the Nazi era in hiding. In the immediate post-war years he made several films in the Eastern Zone for DEFA, but later established himself in West Germany.

Selected filmography
 Marriage in the Shadows (1947)
 Wozzeck (1947)
 The Marriage of Figaro (1949)
 Our Daily Bread (1949)
 Love's Awakening (1953)
 The Great Test (1954)
 Bon Voyage (1954)
 Confess, Doctor Corda (1958)
 Dorothea Angermann (1959)
 A Thousand Stars Aglitter (1959)
 The Death Ship (1959)
 Blind Justice (1961)
 Murderer in the Fog (1964)
 All People Will Be Brothers (1973)

References

Bibliography 
 Noack, Frank. Veit Harlan: The Life and Work of a Nazi Filmmaker. University Press of Kentucky, 2016.

External links 
 

German male film actors
German male television actors
German male stage actors
German male voice actors
People from Pyskowice
20th-century German Jews
1905 births
1989 deaths